; born 8 June 1961, in Tokyo) is a former Japanese rugby union player and coach. He played as a centre.

Career
Yoshinaga started his rugby career when he played for the team of Nippon Sports Sciences University, the university he attended.
After his graduation, Yoshinaga started to play for Mazda Motors Corporation in the All-Japan Rugby Company Championship, in all of his career. 
Yoshinaga was first capped for Japan in the match against Korea, at Bangkok, on 29 November 1986. He also was capped for the 1987 Rugby World Cup, playing 2 matches in the tournament, making him the only player in Mazda Motor Company's history to take part in a Rugby World Cup.
Yoshinaga was also present in the Japanese squad who defeated Scotland in 1989. His last international cap was against Samoa, at Tokyo, on 15 April 1990.

Notes

External links

1961 births
Living people
Rugby union centres
Japanese rugby union coaches
Japanese rugby union players
Japan international rugby union players
Sportspeople from Tokyo